Néstor Fernando Muslera Micol (born 16 June 1986) is a Uruguayan professional footballer who plays as a goalkeeper for Turkish club Galatasaray, whom he captains, and the Uruguay national team.

He is considered one of the finest goalkeepers of his generation and was ranked as high as sixth-best in the world by the International Federation of Football History & Statistics in 2011.

Muslera began his career at Montevideo Wanderers and Nacional, moving to Lazio in 2007 where he won the 2009 Coppa Italia Final. In 2011, he was signed by Galatasaray for a fee of around €12 million, where he has since won honours which include five Süper Lig titles, four Turkish Cups and four Turkish Super Cups.

A full international since 2009, Muslera has earned over 130 caps for Uruguay. He has played in five Copa América tournaments, winning the title in 2011, and played every minute in goal for Uruguay as the country's undisputed number one in the 2010, 2014, and 2018 FIFA World Cups, helping his nation to fourth place in the 2010 edition.

Club career

Uruguay
Born in Buenos Aires, Argentina, Muslera moved with his family to Montevideo where he began his professional football career with Montevideo Wanderers, having come through the club's youth system. After impressive performances for Wanderers, Uruguayan giants Nacional opted to take him on loan in 2007. After a display of successful performances, he began to attract attention from Europe, until he was signed by Lazio in 2007.

Lazio

Lazio signed Muslera in August 2007 for a fee of approximately €3 million. He made his debut for Lazio in a 3–1 home win against Cagliari on 16 September 2007, and made four more consecutive starts, the last which was a disastrous performance in Lazio's 5–1 home loss to Milan on 7 October, a match in which he was at fault on four of the five goals Lazio conceded. That result saw him benched in favour of 44-year-old Marco Ballotta. He remained as the second-choice for the remainder of the season, making only four more Serie A appearances and none in the UEFA Champions League. However, he did play all of Lazio's remaining Coppa Italia matches, putting in good performances.

Muslera began the 2008–09 season as second-choice goalkeeper behind new signing Juan Pablo Carrizo, but regained the starting spot in January 2009 following a run of poor form by Carrizo, coupled with conflicts with team management. Muslera's first starting appearance in the Serie A season saw him make several saves in a 3–1 loss to Sampdoria, including saving an Antonio Cassano penalty. Further impressive performances in away wins over Napoli and Genoa, as well as in his first ever Derby della Capitale against Roma, saw Muslera regain a considerable amount of faith he had lost the previous season.

Known to the Lazio fans as "Castorino", or the "little beaver", Muslera was also an integral part of the club's successful 2008–09 Coppa Italia campaign, making decisive saves against Milan and Juventus as Lazio reached the final for the first time in five seasons. In the final on 13 May 2009, Muslera saved two penalties as Lazio emerged victorious 6–5 in the shootout after the match ended 1–1 in extra time.

The Uruguayan's impressive season saw him cement his position as the Roman club's first choice in the 2009–10 season, despite the arrival of Argentine goalkeeper Albano Bizzarri on a free transfer. Muslera played in goal as Lazio opened the season with a 2–1 win over 2008–09 Serie A champions Internazionale in the 2009 Supercoppa Italiana, played in Beijing.

Following his successful performance in the 2010 FIFA World Cup with Uruguay, Muslera was voted the seventh-best goalkeeper in the world by the International Federation of Football History & Statistics.

Galatasaray

2011–12 season

On 19 July 2011, Turkish Süper Lig club Galatasaray announced the signing of Muslera from Lazio on a five-year contract while he was on duty in the 2011 Copa América with Uruguay. The transfer involved Lorik Cana moving in the opposite direction to Lazio, while Galatasaray also paid €6.75 million to Muslera's former club, Montevideo Wanderers,  (However, Lazio valued the sale of Muslera for free (as termination of contract) as well as signing Cana for a peppercorn of €1 as a special accounting arrangement) Muslera's contract saw him earn €2 million per year.

On 5 November 2011, Muslera was selected the man of the match after saving his first penalty for Galatasaray in the match against Mersin İdmanyurdu, a 0–0 draw. On 8 April 2012, the last day of the 2011–12 Süper Lig season, Muslera scored his first career goal, a penalty against Manisaspor. The same match also resulted in Muslera keeping his 19th clean sheet of the season, an all-time league record.

2012–13 season
Muslera continued to become Galatasaray's first choice goalkeeper in 2012–13, playing in the first match of the season in a 2–1 league victory over Kasımpaşa. On 19 September 2012, he made his UEFA Champions League debut in a match against Manchester United at Old Trafford. Though Galatasaray lost the match 1–0, he saved a penalty from Nani. He kept his first clean sheet in the competition in a 1–0 victory against Manchester United at the Türk Telekom Arena. He played 33 league matches out of 34 with Galatasaray, who retained their league title.

2013–present
On 3 November 2013, Muslera suffered a fractured toe and therefore missed three Süper Lig and two Champions League matches. However, he played 29 league matches out of 34.

At the end of the 2013–14 season, it was announced Muslera extended his contract until 2018, and would earn €2.75 million per season.

Muslera played 31 matches as Galatasaray regained their league title, but was absent in their cup final victory over Bursaspor due to his commitments for the 2015 Copa América.

In a league match against Çaykur Rizespor on 14 June 2020, Muslera suffered a double leg fracture as he collided with a Rizespor player in his box.

On 13 December 2021, in an away league match against Sivasspor, Muslera collided with his teammate Christian Luyindama in his box and was left writhing in pain. Galatasaray stated that the collision had torn the medial collateral ligament on Muslera’s left knee and also hurt the anterior cruciate ligament.

International career

Muslera had been called up for the Uruguay national team on numerous occasions, but did not earn his first cap until 10 October 2009, when he started in Uruguay's 2–1 away win over Ecuador. The match was Uruguay's penultimate qualifier for the 2010 FIFA World Cup in South Africa.

2010 FIFA World Cup
Muslera made his World Cup debut against France on 11 June 2010, Uruguay's opening match of the tournament. He kept a clean sheet during all three of Uruguay's group matches (0–0 against France, 3–0 against South Africa and 1–0 against Mexico). In the round of 16, Uruguay faced South Korea; before the goal Uruguay conceded, Muslera had set a record for longest unbeaten goalkeeper in the World Cup. He was decisive in the quarter-final match against Ghana, where he saved two penalties at the penalty shootout. He was a key component of the Uruguay team that reached the semi-finals of the World Cup and subsequently finished fourth in the tournament.

2011 Copa América
Muslera was called again by coach Óscar Tabárez to represent Uruguay as the first-choice goalkeeper at the 2011 Copa América, held in Argentina. He was selected man of the match in the quarter-final against Argentina in which Uruguay progressed on penalties, with Muslera saving a penalty from Carlos Tevez to win the match. Uruguay went on to win the Copa América title, defeating Paraguay 3–0 in the final. Muslera started every game and played in every minute of Uruguay’s successful cup campaign.

He is regarded as a Uruguayan legend and a international icon in the country.

Later career

Muslera was Uruguay's first-choice goalkeeper at the 2014 World Cup and the 2015 Copa América, playing every minute as Uruguay reached the last 16 of the former and the quarter-finals of the latter. He similarly featured in all of Uruguay's games at the Copa América Centenario the following year, where they suffered a first round elimination.

In May 2018 Muslera was named in Uruguay's provisional 26-man squad for the 2018 FIFA World Cup in Russia. He later made the final 23-man squad, and in his nation's second match of the tournament on 20 June, a 1–0 win over Saudi Arabia, he equaled the record of Ladislao Mazurkiewicz for the most World Cup appearances by Uruguayan footballer, with 13 such appearances. In his team's final group match on 25 June, a 3–0 win over hosts Russia on 25 June, he broke Mazurkiewicz's record with his 14th World Cup appearance for Uruguay, also making his 100th appearance for his country in the same match, marking the occasion with his third consecutive clean sheet of the tournament. In the quarter-final match against France on 6 July, Uruguay were defeated 2–0; the second goal of the match arose after Muslera mishandled Antoine Griezmann's strike from outside the area.

On 6 September 2019, Muslera made his first appearance as Uruguay's captain, starting in a 2–1 friendly away win against Costa Rica.

Recently in January 2023, Fernando along with one more player, faced a ban for four matches by FIFA, and a fine of $21,701 for misconduct during FIFA World Cup in Qatar.

Style of play
An acrobatic goalkeeper, Muslera is mainly known for his excellent shot-stopping and ability in the air.

Career statistics

Club

International

Honours
Nacional
 Liguilla: 2007

Lazio
 Coppa Italia: 2008–09
 Supercoppa Italiana: 2009

Galatasaray
 Süper Lig: 2011–12, 2012–13, 2014–15, 2017–18, 2018–19
 Turkish Cup: 2013–14, 2014–15, 2015–16, 2018–19
 Turkish Super Cup: 2012, 2013, 2015, 2016, 2019

Uruguay
 Copa América: 2011

Individual
Süper Lig: Goalkeeper of the Year 2011–12
Turkish Footballer of the Year: 2016

See also
List of men's footballers with 100 or more international caps

References

External links

Profile at Galatasaray.org

Lazio sign keeper Muslera – Sky Sports, 29 August 2007
Muslera Meltdown – Goal.com, 8 October 2007
Biography in Spanish

Living people
1986 births
Footballers from Buenos Aires
People with acquired Uruguayan citizenship
Footballers from Montevideo
Uruguayan footballers
Association football goalkeepers
Montevideo Wanderers F.C. players
Club Nacional de Football players
S.S. Lazio players
Galatasaray S.K. footballers
Uruguayan Primera División players
Serie A players
Süper Lig players
Uruguay international footballers
2010 FIFA World Cup players
2011 Copa América players
2013 FIFA Confederations Cup players
2014 FIFA World Cup players
2015 Copa América players
Copa América Centenario players
2018 FIFA World Cup players
2019 Copa América players
2021 Copa América players
2022 FIFA World Cup players
Copa América-winning players
FIFA Century Club
Uruguayan expatriate footballers
Uruguayan expatriate sportspeople in Italy
Uruguayan expatriate sportspeople in Turkey
Expatriate footballers in Italy
Expatriate footballers in Turkey